Light Blue Sun is the second album by violinist/vocalist Lili Haydn. It was released in 2003 by BMG Music.

Track listing
 Light Blue Sun (Prelude) (Lili Haydn, Corky James) 2:44
 Come Here (Haydn, Rick Boston) 5:34
 Anything (Haydn, Peter Rafelson) 6:08
 Wounded Dove (Haydn) 6:55
 The Longing (Albinoni; add. music by Haydn) 5:08
 Denied (Lotus Weinstock) 5:42
 The Chinese Song (add. music by Haydn) 6:26
 Sweetness (Haydn, Jez Colin) 4:26
 Seek (Haydn, Siri Ved K. Khalsa) 8:13
 Home (Haydn, Tony McAnany) 6:47
 The Promised Land (Weinstock, Haydn, Steve Nalepa) 10:23
 Anything (radio edit) 3:39

Musicians
Lili Haydn: violin and vocals on all tracks; keyboard/programming on 4, 7, 9 and 10
Bill Laswell: bass on 1, 3, 4, 5, 7, 9, 12
Corky James: guitar on 1, 3, 4, 5, 7, 10, 12
Steve Nalepa (DJ Sherlock): keyboards/ambience on 1, 4, 9, 10, 11; keyboard bass on 10; programming on 3, 9 and 12
Karsh Kale: beat construction and additional production on 1, 5, 7; drums on 2, 4, 5 and tablas on 5, 7
Jez Colin: programming/keyboards/ambiance on 4, 8, 10
Satnam Singh Ramgotra: tablas on 2, 4, 7
Goffrey Moore: guitar on 8, 10
Pharoah Sanders: tenor saxophone on 11
George Clinton: spoken word on 11
Alice Coltrane: piano on 6
Teo Castro: programming on 3, 12
Bahar: Qawali vocal on 1
Gerri Sutyak: cello on 3, 4 and 12
Vanessa Freebairn-Smith: cello on 3, 4 and 12
Alma Fernandez: viola on 3, 4 and 12
Julianna Klopotic: violin on 6
Ron Lawrence: viola on 6
Tara Chambers: cello on 6
Marius DeVries: bass and programming on 2
Carmen Rizzo: keyboards, programming and sound design on 2
Chris Bruce: guitar on 2
Produced by Bill Laswell and Lili Haydn

2003 albums
Lili Haydn albums
Albums produced by Bill Laswell